Komitée für das Frauenstimmrecht ("Committee for Women's Suffrage" ), was a women's rights organization in Liechtenstein, founded in 1969. It was the first women's suffrage organization in Liechtenstein, and one of the main organizations working to introduce Women's suffrage in Liechtenstein.

After the 1968 Liechtenstein referendums resulted in a defeat for the suggestion to introduce women's suffrage, the Komitée für das Frauenstimmrecht was founded to actively work for the issue. It was the first women's suffrage organization in the nation. It was founded on 7 November 1969.

It was founded by a group of women suffragists, among them Bernadette Brunhart and Elfriede Winiger, secretaries in the state administration. The Liechtenstein suffragists initially kept their distance from fighting in the style of the internationally known British suffragettes. The committee tried to promote a positive change through discussion evenings and active participation in the political parties.

Women's suffrage was finally approved in the 1984 Liechtenstein women's suffrage referendum.

References

 Thomas Ernst Wanger: Vom Frauenstudium zum Frauenwahlrecht in der Schweiz und in Liechtenstein. In: Internationaler Verein für Geschichte des Bodensees und seiner Umgebung (Hrsg.): Schriften des Vereins für Geschichte des Bodensees und seiner Umgebung. Band 122. Jan Thorbecke Verlag, Ostfildern 2004, ISBN 3-7995-1710-3

Feminist organizations in Europe
1969 establishments in Liechtenstein
Political organizations based in Liechtenstein
Women's suffrage in Liechtenstein
Organizations established in 1969
Voter rights and suffrage organizations
1969 in women's history